Madrie Le Roux (born 19 April 1995) is a South African former tennis player.

Born in Uitenhage, Le Roux was introduced to tennis at the age of six. On the ITF Junior Circuit, she has been ranked as high as world No. 69, achieved in January 2013.

On the ITF Women's Circuit, Le Roux has won seven doubles titles.

From November 2017 until November 2018, she did not play a single professional match.

ITF finals

Singles (0–3)

Doubles (7–8)

Fed Cup participation

Singles

Doubles

External links
 
 
 

1995 births
Living people
South African people of French descent
South African female tennis players
People from Uitenhage
People from Potchefstroom
White South African people
Sportspeople from the Eastern Cape